Jeffrey C. Smith (born December 6, 1949) is an American attorney and politician who served as a Republican member of the Mississippi House of Representatives from 1992 to 2020.

Early life and education 
Smith was born and raised in Columbus, Mississippi. He earned a Bachelor of Science degree from Mississippi State University and a Juris Doctor from the University of Missouri School of Law.

Career 
Smith served as a prosecutor for Lowndes County from 1980 to 1989. He was elected to the Mississippi House of Representatives in November 1991 and assumed office in January 1992. Smith switched from the Democratic Party to the Republicans on June 1, 2011, later explaining that he decided to become a Republican because the Republicans had recruited a candidate to run against him in the upcoming election for House speaker.

Following Speaker William McCoy's decision not to run for re-election in 2011, Smith had been considered a possible frontrunner for the speakership. He lost the 2008 speaker election, in which he was supported by the Republicans; by some Democrats who (like Smith) have since bolted the party; and by Republican governor Haley Barbour by a single vote. The House voted on a new speaker at the start of the 2012 session. A narrow margin of power for either party following the election could force lawmakers to form a coalition in order to elect a new speaker. In the end, however, Philip Gunn was elected speaker without opposition.

Elections

2007
On November 6, 2007 Smith was re-elected in District 39. He defeated James Samuel in the Democratic primary election and ran unopposed in the general election.

2011
Smith was unopposed for re-election (as a Republican) in the 2011 election for Mississippi House of Representatives District 39. He defeated Jack Larmour in the Republican primary on August 2, 2011. No Democratic candidates filed to run for election, and he was re-elected in general election on November 8, 2011.

Personal life
Smith is president of Swim Columbus and is a deacon of the First Baptist Church in Columbus. He is married to Laura Terrell and they have a son named Corky.

External links
 Mississippi House Member Page
 Legislative profile from Project Vote Smart
 Biography from Project Vote Smart
 Campaign contributions: 2009, 2007, 2005, 2003, 1999

References

Members of the Mississippi House of Representatives
Mississippi lawyers
Mississippi Republicans
Mississippi Democrats
1949 births
Living people
People from Columbus, Mississippi
21st-century American politicians